6th Canadian Combat Support Brigade (French: 6e Brigade d’appui au combat du Canada) (6 CCSB) is a Canadian Forces combat support brigade that is part of 5th Canadian Division of the Canadian Army. It is spread out over different bases in Canada but the head quarter is based at CFB Gagetown, near Fredericton, New Brunswick.

Units 
Structure of the 6 CCSB

History 
6th CCSB was created on April 2018. The formation's goal is to generates professional and specialized forces that can provide, sustained, scalable and coordinated combat support enablers and effects to any operations. 6th CCSB is a mixed team of Regular Force and Primary Reserve soldiers, supported by civilians, who operate alongside Whole-of-Government colleagues, non-governmental agencies, and coalition partners to support Canadian Armed Forces missions.

Unlike the other Regular Force brigade (1 Canadian Mechanized Brigade Group, 2 Canadian Mechanized Brigade Group and 5 Canadian Mechanized Brigade Group) 6 CCSB  is not a mechanized brigade nor will it fight on its own or be involve as a main combat entity.

References

See also 

 Canada portal

 Military history of Canada
 History of the Canadian Army
 Canadian Forces

Military organization